Party for the Defence of the Interests of Kolda (in French: Parti de la défense des intérêts de Kolda) was a political party in Kolda, Senegal. It existed around 1960.

Sources
Nzouakeu, Jacques Mariel. Les parties politiques sénégalais. Dakar: Editions Clairafrique, 1984.

Political parties in Senegal